David Allen, known professionally as Dave (Gruber) Allen is an American television and film actor and comedian, best known for his work on the 1990 TV series The Higgins Boys and Gruber and playing guidance counselor Jeff Rosso on the Judd Apatow-produced comedy-drama Freaks and Geeks. He also played Mr. Kwest on Ned's Declassified School Survival Guide and a town troubadour on Gilmore Girls. Allen had a minor role as an "Electrocuted Ghost" known as "Sparky" in the 2016 film Ghostbusters.

Personal life
Allen was born and raised in Naperville, Illinois. He graduated from Naperville Central High School, where a classmate gave him the nickname "Groover" which over time changed to "Gruber" and inspired his professional name. His preferred way to be identified professionally is "Dave (Gruber) Allen", with "Gruber" in parentheses.

Career 
Allen plays the "Naked Trucker," a character that first appeared as part of a sketch comedy show 2 Headed Dog. In 1998, at the invitation of Largo owner Mark Flannigan, Allen began to appear as the Naked Trucker as a solo act, opening at Largo in L.A. for Tenacious D, Jon Brion, and others. The act was an instant success and soon expanded to include David Koechner, who plays "T-Bones." Koechner and Allen starred in The Naked Trucker and T-Bones Show on Comedy Central, which was picked up for eight episodes.

Allen is a member of comedy group 2 Headed Dog with comedians Jim Turner, Mark Fite, and Craig Anton. He also made an appearance as a minor character, Mr. Woodward, one of Reese's teachers on the television show Malcolm in the Middle. Allen frequently plays the character "Todd Carlin", a fictional hippie relative of George Carlin. Allen has guest starred on Gilmore Girls, where he played a town troubadour, organic farmer, and a de facto minister officiating a wedding. He has been credited in many movies and television roles as Dave (Gruber) Allen and David Gruber Allen.

Allen has provided multiple voice performances, such as on animated series King of the Hill episodes "Unfortunate Son", "Phish and Wildlife", "Raise the Steaks", and "Bill's House". Allen has also provided his voice in Random! Cartoons clips.
Later on, Allen also played several different characters in NBC's Newsradio, and appeared as night school teacher "Randy", teaching basic auto repair and maintenance in the episode "Motor Skills" of the eighth season of the sitcom Frasier. He has appeared as a hippie on Mr. Show with Bob and David and a protester on Arrested Development. In 2006, Allen appeared in the Stan and Lois sketch on Norm Macdonald's comedy album Ridiculous (released by Comedy Central Records).

In November 2008, Allen appeared as "Todd"—and was credited as "Todd Carlin"—in the Cinematic Titanic episode "Santa Claus Conquers the Martians" during the pre-movie sequence, introducing the movie to the crew. Additionally, Allen has been touring periodically at live shows with Cinematic Titanic, performing his stand-up routine. In 2010, Allen was featured as a sci-fi author in season two of Party Down and made a cameo in the film The Mother of Invention as Dr. Henry Miller. In 2011, Allen had a small role in the movie Bad Teacher. In 2012, Allen played the salesman of a futuristic elder care center in "Life Begins at Rewirement," an episode of the ITVS/PBS sci-fi series Futurestates. He also appeared in a recurring role on the CBS series Mike & Molly.

Allen also provided the voice of Frostferatu, among several other characters, in Cartoon Network's Mighty Magiswords episodes "Share and Share Dislike", "Hideous Hound", "Transylbabies", "Collection Infection", and "King of Zombeez", created by MooBeard the Cow Pirate creator, Kyle A. Carrozza. In 2017, Allen appeared as the recurring character Dave the Taxidermist in NBC's Trial & Error.

Filmography

Film

Television

References

External links 

 
 Interview with Allen & partner David Koechner on public radio program The Sound of Young America
 Dave Allen at live Cinematic Titanic shows, performing standup and discussing his preferred method of writing his name (using parenthesis rather than quotation marks).
 Dave Allen in Life Begins at Rewirement
 

American male comedians
American comedy musicians
American male film actors
American male television actors
American television writers
American male television writers
Living people
1958 births
Writers from Naperville, Illinois
Screenwriters from Illinois
Comedians from Illinois